Tom Bush (7 January 1918 – 17 November 1951) was an Australian rules footballer who played with Melbourne in the Victorian Football League (VFL).

Bush, who was originally from Berrigan was cleared from St. Kilda to Melbourne where he played from 1942 to 1944.

Bush played one game on permit with Coburg in 1945.

Bush then played with Wangaratta in the Ovens & Murray Football League in 1945 and 1946. 

Milawa Football Club appointed Bush as captain-coach in 1947. They were runners up in the Ovens & King Football League grand final to Moyhu in 1947.

Bush was then captain-coach of Coolamon Football Club in the South West Football League (New South Wales) in 1948 to fifth position on the ladder. 

In his first year as captain-coach of Peechelba Football Club in 1949 in the Murray Valley Football League, Bush won the league best and fairest award.

Notes

External links 

Tom Bush Profile @ Demonwiki

1918 births
Australian rules footballers from Victoria (Australia)
Melbourne Football Club players
1951 deaths